Actinoceramus  is an extinct genus of fossil saltwater clams, marine pteriomorphian bivalve molluscs. These bivalves were facultatively mobile infaunal suspension feeders.

Actinoceramus sulcatus marks the oldest appearance of well-developed radial folds, though the functional significance is still under debate. The wide range of localities and abundance of fossils coupled with an ease of identification leads scientists to consider this genus the most "successful" marine bivalve of the Late Cretaceous.

Species 
Species within Actinoceramus:
 Inoceramus (Actinoceramus) concentricus Parkinson 1819
 Inoceramus (Actinoceramus) salomoni d'Orbigny 1850
 Inoceramus (Actinoceramus) subsulcatus Wiltshire 1869
 Inoceramus (Actinoceramus) sulcatus Parkinson 1819

Distribution 
Fossils of species of this genus have been found in the Cretaceous of Antarctica, Australia, Brazil, Canada, Colombia (Hiló Formation, Tolima), Ecuador, Egypt, France, Germany, Italy, Japan, New Zealand, Peru, Russia, Spain, the United Kingdom and the United States.

References

External links 
 Encyclopaedia of Life

Inoceramidae
Prehistoric bivalve genera
Cretaceous bivalves
Prehistoric invertebrates of Oceania
Extinct animals of Antarctica
Cretaceous animals of Africa
Cretaceous animals of Asia
Cretaceous animals of Europe
Cretaceous animals of North America
Cretaceous Canada
Cretaceous United States
Cretaceous animals of South America
Cretaceous Brazil
Cretaceous Colombia
Cretaceous Ecuador
Cretaceous Peru
Albian genus first appearances
Cenomanian genus extinctions
Fossil taxa described in 1864